A public health intervention is any effort or policy that attempts to improve mental and physical health on a population level. Public health interventions may be run by a variety of organizations, including governmental health departments and non-governmental organizations (NGOs). Common types of interventions include screening programs, vaccination, food and water supplementation, and health promotion. Common issues that are the subject of public health interventions include obesity, drug, tobacco, and alcohol use, and the spread of infectious disease, e.g. HIV.

A policy may meet the criteria of a public health intervention if it prevents disease on both the individual and community level and has a positive impact on public health.

Types  
Health interventions may be run by a variety of organizations, including health departments and private organizations. Such interventions can operate at various scales, such as on a global, country, or community level. The whole population can be reached via websites, audio/video messages and other mass media, or specific groups can be affected by administrative action, such as increasing the provision of healthy food at schools.

Screening 

Screening refers to the practice of testing a set of individuals who meet a certain criteria (such as age, sex, or sexual activity) for a disease or disorder. Many forms of screening are public health interventions. For example, mothers are routinely screened for HIV and Hepatitis B during pregnancy. Detection during pregnancy can prevent maternal transmission of the disease during childbirth.

Vaccination 

Vaccination programs are one of the most effective and common types of public health interventions. Typically programs may be in the form of recommendations or run by governmental health departments or nationalised health care systems. For instance, in the U.S., the Center for Disease Control decides on a vaccination schedule, and most private health insurers cover these vaccinations. In the UK, the NHS both decides and implements vaccination protocols. NGOs also may be involved in funding or implementing vaccination programs; for instance Bill and Melinda Gates Foundation assists governments in Pakistan, Nigeria and Afghanistan with the administration of polio vaccination.

Supplementation 
Supplementation of food or water of nutrients can reduce vitamin deficiency and other diseases. Supplementation may be required by law or voluntary. Some examples of interventions include:

 Iodised salt to prevent goitre.
 Folic acid in wheat flour to prevent spina bifida, a birth defect. 
 Fluoridated water to prevent tooth decay.
 Vitamin D milk to prevent rickets.

Behavioural 

Interventions intended to change the behaviour of individuals can be especially challenging. One such form is health promotion, where education and media may be used to promote healthy behaviours, such as eating healthy foods (to prevent obesity), using condoms (to prevent the transmission of STDs), or stopping open defecation in developing countries (see for example in India the campaign Swachh Bharat Mission).

The use of laws to criminalise certain behaviours can also be considered a public health intervention, such as mandatory vaccination programs and criminalisation of HIV transmission. However, such measures are typically controversial, particularly in the case of HIV criminalisation where there is evidence it may be counter productive. Laws which tax certain unhealthy products may also be effective, although also not without controversy, and are sometimes called a "sin tax". Examples include the taxation of tobacco products in the U.S. and New Zealand, and sugared drinks in the UK.

Evaluating efficacy 
Evaluating and predicting the efficacy of a public health intervention, as well as calculating cost effectiveness, is essential. An intervention should ideally lower morbidity and mortality. Several systematic protocols exist to assist developing such interventions, such as Intervention Mapping.

See also 

 WASH (water, sanitation, hygiene)

References 

Public health